The Virginia House of Delegates election of 1985 was held on Tuesday, November 5. Primary elections were held on June 11, 1985.

Results

Overview 

Source

See also 
 1985 United States elections
 1985 Virginia elections
 1985 Virginia gubernatorial election
 1985 Virginia lieutenant gubernatorial election
 1985 Virginia Attorney General election

References 

House of Delegates
Virginia
Virginia House of Delegates elections